The House of Representatives is one of the two chambers—the other of which is the House of Councillors—of the Moroccan Parliament. The House of Representatives has 395 members elected for five-year terms, 305 of whom are elected in multi-seat constituencies, and 90 of whom are elected in two national lists dedicated to promote gender equality and national youth.

History 
On 24 January 2023, the House of Representatives approved a bill that would set a level of “adequate knowledge” of Tamazight as a condition for obtaining Moroccan citizenship.

See also
 House of Councillors
 List of presidents of the House of Representatives of Morocco

References

Morocco
Government of Morocco